Pyrgotis humilis is a species of moth of the  family Tortricidae. It is endemic to New Zealand. This species was first described by Alfred Philpott in 1930 from a specimen collected by C. E. Clarke on Mount Maungatua in Otago.

The wingspan is about 12 mm. The forewings are bright ochreous, suffused with purplish fuscous towards the termen. The hindwings are fuscous. Adults have been recorded in December.

References

	

Moths described in 1930
Archipini
Endemic fauna of New Zealand
Moths of New Zealand
Endemic moths of New Zealand